Sodium metasilicate is the chemical substance with formula , which is the main component of commercial sodium silicate solutions.  It is an ionic compound consisting of sodium cations  and the polymeric metasilicate anions [––]n.  It is a colorless crystalline hygroscopic and deliquescent solid, soluble in water (giving an alkaline solution) but not in alcohols.

Preparation and properties
The anhydrous compound can be prepared by fusing silicon dioxide  (silica, quartz) with sodium oxide  in 1:1 molar ratio.

The compound crystallizes from solution as various hydrates, such as 
 pentahydrate ·5 (CAS 10213-79-3, EC 229-912-9, PubChem 57652358)
 nonahydrate ·9 (CAS 13517-24-3, EC 229-912-9, PubChem 57654617)

Structure
In the anhydrous solid, the metasilicate anion is actually polymeric, consisting of corner-shared {SiO4} tetrahedra, and not a discrete SiO32−  ion.

In addition to the anhydrous form, there are hydrates with the formula Na2SiO3·nH2O (where n = 5, 6, 8, 9), which contain the discrete, approximately tetrahedral anion SiO2(OH)22− with water of hydration. For example, the commercially available sodium silicate pentahydrate Na2SiO3·5H2O is formulated as Na2SiO2(OH)2·4H2O, and the nonahydrate Na2SiO3·9H2O is formulated as Na2SiO2(OH)2·8H2O. The pentahydrate and nonahydrate forms have their own CAS Numbers, 10213-79-3 and 13517-24-3 respectively.

Uses
Sodium Metasilicate reacts with acids to produce silica gel.

 Cements and Binders - dehydrated sodium metasilicate forms cement or binding agent.
 Pulp and Par - sizing agent and buffer/stabilizing agent when mixed with hydrogen peroxide.
 Soaps and Detergents - as an emulsifying and suspension agent. 
 Automotive applications - decommissioning of old engines (CARS program), cooling system sealant, exhaust repair.
 Egg Preservative - seals eggs increasing shelf life.
 Crafts - forms "stalagmites" by reacting with and precipitating metal ions. Also used as a glue called "soluble glass".
 Hair coloring kits

See also
 Potassium metasilicate
 Sodium orthosilicate
 Sodium pyrosilicate

References

Inorganic silicon compounds
Sodium compounds
Metasilicates